Ameles spallanzania, common name European dwarf mantis, is a species of praying mantis.

Etymology
The species name spallanzania honors the Italian naturalist Lazzaro Spallanzani.

Description
Their colour may be brown, green, ocher or grey. The eyes are slightly pointed, antennae are threadlike, the pronotum is short and squared and the broad abdomen of the females is commonly curled upwards. This very small mantid (hence the common name) is characterized by an evident sexual dimorphism. The males are winged and have a quite slender body, while females show stubby bodies and are unable to fly, as they possess only small wing vestiges (brachypterous).

Biology
This thermophile species shows adaptable life-cycle strategies in different latitudes, as hatching earlier, more than one generation per year or overwintering nymphs or oothecae. Adults can be found from late spring to late summer, depending on the latitude. Nymphs usually hatch in July and the ootheca is commonly laid in September.

Similarly to the common Mantis religiosa the females may cannibalise the males whilst mating.

Distribution
This species can be found in the Mediterranean area, from Morocco to Greece and from southern Europe to northern Africa (Albania, Algeria, Dalmatia, France, Greece, Italy, Malta, Libya, Morocco, Portugal, Spain, Tunisia).

Habitat
These mantids prefer sparse low vegetation in warm, dry places.

Bibliography

 David D. Yager & Gavin J. Svenson: Patterns of praying mantis auditory system evolution based on morphological, molecular, neurophysiological, and behavioural data. Biological Journal of the Linnean Society, 94, S. 541–568, 2008
 Gavin J. Svenson & Michael F. Whiting: Reconstructing the origins of praying mantises (Dictyoptera, Mantodea): the roles of Gondwanan vicariance and morphological convergence. Cladistics, 25, S. 468–514, 2009, S. 484 doi:10.1111/j.1096-0031.2009.00263.
 Roberto Battiston & P. Fontana: A contribution to the knowledge of the genus Ameles Burmeister, 1838, with the description of a new species from Jordan (Insecta Mantodea). Atti della Accademia Roveretana degli Agiati, Serie 8 B, Classe di Scienze, Matematiche, Fisiche e Naturali, 5B, S. 173-197, 2005
 Cogo A. & Battiston R., 2007 – Nuovi dati sulla distribuzione di ameles spallanzania (Rossi, 1792) in Italia. (Insecta Mantodea, Amelinae). Natura Vicentina,11: 23-29
 Battiston R., Picciau L., Fontana P. & Marshall J., 2010 –The Mantids of the Euro Mediterranean Area. World Biodiversity association, Verona
 Agabiti, Barbara; Salvatrice, Ippolito; Lomabardo, Francesco, 2010: The Mediterranean species of the genus Ameles Burmeister, 1838 Insecta, Mantodea Amelinae, with a biogeographic and phylogenetic evaluation. Boletin de la SEA 47 (31 Dec): 1-20.
 Salemi M., Tomasinelli F., Le mantidi religiose e gli insetti stecco, De Vecchi Editore, 2006, .

See also
 List of mantis genera and species

References

External links

 Amici Insoliti

spallanzania
Mantodea of Europe
Insects described in 1792
Taxa named by Pietro Rossi